Per se may refer to:
 per se, a Latin phrase meaning "by itself" or "in itself".
Illegal per se, the legal usage in criminal and antitrust law
Negligence per se, legal use in tort law
Per Se (restaurant), a New York City restaurant

See also
 Perse (disambiguation)
 Pro se legal representation in the United States